Tina Martin McDuffie is an American television host, reporter, professor and public speaker. Martin is an Associate Professor of the Practice of Journalism at Boston University. She is a public television program host and reporter. She hosts the WORLD Channel/ WGBH series Local, USA and is a television and radio reporter and host for WGBH News in Boston. She is also a contributor on PBS News Hour. and NPR. She received a regional Edward R. Murrow Award as part of a team of three reporters.

She graduated from Emerson College in Boston with a degree in broadcast journalism. She also received an award from the National Endowment for Financial Education. Martin has also won numerous other awards including 2 National Association of Black Journalists awards, 9 Telly Awards, & 2 Public Radio News Directors awards. Martin was inducted into the WERS radio Hall of Fame by her alma mater Emerson College in 2018. In 2022, she was named a Distinguished Alumni of Emerson College--the highest honor the university gives to alumni. 

Martin McDuffie is also currently working as a co-host of an original podcast with the Boston Globe.

References

Year of birth missing (living people)
Living people
Emerson College alumni
American women television journalists
21st-century American women